Neale Fraser defeated Rod Laver 6–4, 6–4, 10–8 in the final to win the men's singles tennis title at the 1960 U.S. National Championships.

Seeds
The seeded players are listed below. Neale Fraser is the champion; others show the round in which they were eliminated.

 Neale Fraser (champion)
 Rod Laver (finalist)
 Barry MacKay (fourth round)
 Cliff Buchholz (first round)
 Tut Bartzen (first round)
 Roy Emerson (third round)
 Ron Holmberg (fourth round)
 Bobby Wilson (quarterfinals)

Draw

Key
 Q = Qualifier
 WC = Wild card
 LL = Lucky loser
 r = Retired

Final eight

Earlier rounds

Section 1

Section 2

Section 3

Section 4

Section 5

Section 6

Section 7

Section 8

References

External links
 1960 U.S. National Championships on ITFtennis.com, the source for this draw (now dead link)
 Association of Tennis Professionals (ATP) – 1960 U.S. Championships Men's Singles draw

U.S. National Championships (tennis) by year – Men's singles
Mens Singles